Sun Devil Gym is a 4,609-seat multi-purpose arena in Tempe, Arizona.   It was home to the Arizona State University Sun Devils basketball team from 1953 until the Desert Financial Arena opened in 1974.  The building is now known as Physical Education West and is used mostly for classrooms and events.

Prior to its opening, the basketball team played at either College Gym (cap. 1,500) on the Tempe campus, or at the Mesa Civic Center.

References

Defunct college basketball venues in the United States
Arizona State Sun Devils men's basketball
Arizona State University buildings
Basketball venues in Arizona
Sports venues in Tempe, Arizona
Sports venues completed in 1953
1953 establishments in Arizona